Singapore maintains an active conscription system in accordance with the regulations set by the Government of Singapore, known as National Service (NS). This requires all qualified male Singaporean citizens and second-generation permanent residents to serve a period of active duty military service in the uniformed services. Public opposition and defaulting the national service is punishable by fine and imprisonment. 

It was first instituted in 1967 to help build Singapore's armed forces soon after the country gained independence in 1965, and has since been expanded to involve the police force and civil defence force. Upon enlistment, male citizens and second-generation permanent residents serve two years in active duty as full-time national servicemen (NSFs) in the Singapore Armed Forces (SAF), Singapore Police Force (SPF) or Singapore Civil Defence Force (SCDF), following which they transit to an operationally-ready reservist state as operationally-ready national servicemen (NSmen). 

The majority of NSFs serve in the Army. The reasons for this include the relative manpower needs of the Army compared to the Navy, Air Force, Police Force and Civil Defence Force. Moreover, as compared to the Army, the Air Force and Navy are smaller armed services composed primarily of regular servicemen. As the manpower requirements of the Navy and Air Force tend to be more specialised, the constant periodic turnover of NSFs is considered to be very disruptive. The statutory age cap for reservist obligations is 40 for warrant officers, specialists and enlistees, and 50 for commissioned officers.

History
The National Service (Amendment) Bill was passed on 14 March 1967, making National Service (NS) compulsory for all 18-year-old male Singapore citizens and permanent residents. The Singapore government felt that it was necessary to build a substantial military force to defend the country, which had only about 1,000 soldiers when it became independent in 1965. In the late 1960s, the British government had decided to withdraw troops and bases from the East of Suez, including troops stationed in Singapore. That prompted the Singapore government to implement a conscription programme for the country's defence needs. It adopted a conscription model drawing on elements from the Israeli and Swiss national conscription schemes. About 9,000 young men born between 1 January and 30 June 1949 became the first batch of enlistees to be drafted for national service. Singapore had sought assistance through official diplomacy from other countries, but their refusal to provide help prompted Israeli diplomats to extend a helping hand to Singapore in the establishment of the Singapore Armed Forces.

The stated rationale behind conscription is two-fold. Firstly, because Singapore has a population of about 5.5 million (as of 2014), an army consisting of only regulars would not be sufficient to defend the country. Secondly, national service is supposed to promote racial harmony among the Chinese, Malay and Indian communities. 

From 1971 to 2004, the duration of the conscription was either two years or two and half years, depending on the conscript's educational qualifications. By December 2004, the duration has been reduced to two years, driven by the evolution of the Singapore Armed Forces into the Third Generation Singapore Armed Forces and the increase in the number of enlistees over the next ten years. As a bonus incentive, the national service duration can be reduced by a further two months for combat-fit enlistees (PES A or B1) who pass the Individual Physical Proficiency Test (IPPT) prior to enlistment. However, non-combat-fit enlistees (PES B2 and below) will still serve the full 24 months of national service.

Enlistment

According to the Enlistment Act, conscription is mandatory for all "persons subject to [the] act", defined as those who are not less than 16.5 years of age and not more than 40 years of age, with some exemptions and with no specific bias to gender (not limited to males).

Male Singapore citizens and second-generation permanent residents who have registered for their National Registration Identity Card (NRIC) are required to register for national service upon reaching the age of 16 years and six months, during which they would also be required to undergo a mandatory medical examination to determine their Physical Employment Standards (PES) status, which in most cases, determines which vocational groups the pre-enlistee is physically able to be posted to.

Early enlistment
There is a voluntary early enlist scheme by the Central Manpower Base (CMPB) for pre-enlistees who opt for early enlistment, with the consent of their parents, to begin their full-time national service at the earliest age of 16 years and six months.

Mono intake
Mono-intake refers to a type of enlistment where conscripts are directly enlisted into an active battalion unit and undergo their Basic Military Training (BMT) at Pulau Tekong before returning to their battalion. Exceptions to the mono-intake programme include conscripts enlisted in the Naval Diving Unit, Commandos and certain support vocations.

Second-generation male permanent residents
Second-generation male permanent residents are required by law to serve national service just like male citizens. The rationale is that they too enjoy the socio-economic national benefits of schooling and living in "peacetime" Singapore. Their failure to serve national service will be taken into account should they decide to study, work or travel in Singapore in the future. The government advises of such consequences at the point of renunciation. After completing mandatory full-time national service, they can qualify to apply for the accelerated Singapore citizenship scheme. However, citizenship is not guaranteed for all applicants, as there are certain criteria that must be met such as educational qualification, income qualification and national service work performance/ conduct appraisal in the certificate issued upon the completion of full-time national service. From 2006 to 2010, about 2% of 3,000 second-generation permanent residents who have completed full-time national service and applied for Singapore citizenship had had their applications rejected.

If the person is not granted Singapore citizenship but still holds Singapore permanent residency, he is still obliged by law to serve the national service obligations, i.e. operationally-ready reservist duties/in-camp trainings.

Singapore permanent residents who served national service but did not acquire Singapore citizenship will be treated equally to those permanent residents without service obligation; they would not have access to the privileges granted to Singapore citizens.

Deferment
According to the Ministry of Defence, national service in Singapore is based on principles of universality and equity, and these principles must be upheld so as to ensure Singaporeans' important support of and commitment to national service. If Singapore citizens are allowed to choose when they want to serve national service, it would not be fair to the vast majority of national servicemen who have served the country dutifully, and the institutions of national service will be undermined.

Pre-enlistees are allowed to defer national service to complete full-time tertiary studies, up to the first pre-university qualification bar (GCE Advanced Level or Polytechnic Diploma or their equivalent) before enlistment for Basic Military Training (BMT).

Those granted approval in national sports teams to compete in national/overseas events will be drafted as soon as they return from one of the national-level events. As of July 2018, only three persons (Maximilian Soh, Joseph Schooling and Quah Zheng Wen) have been granted deferment.

Disruption
Under special circumstances, Singaporean males are allowed to disrupt their national service before the completion of their full-time national service if they fulfil one of the following conditions:

 Accepted an offer into a local undergraduate medical school (Lee Kong Chian School of Medicine or Yong Loo Lin School of Medicine) to begin tertiary studies. Upon completion of the curriculum, as well as a mandatory year of Postgraduate Year 1 work, they will be required to complete the remaining duration of their national service as a Medical Officer after undergoing the Medical Officer Conversion Course. This form of disruption falls under the Local Medicine Disruption scheme, and is offered to those who:
 Have more than a year of National Service obligation 
 Have less than a year of National Service obligation, but must extend their duration of service until a total of one year remains.
 Are recipients of a Public Service Commission (PSC) Scholarship. Those who are awarded the PSC Overseas Merit Scholarship are granted disruption in the first year of full-time national service to pursue their studies in an overseas university.

Exemption
Complete national service exemptions, usually resulting from permanent disabilities or severe medical conditions are to be graded PES F by the Singapore Armed Forces Medical Board.

Failure to enlist
Those who are liable to serve national service but refuse are charged under the Enlistment Act. If convicted, they face up to both three years' imprisonment and a fine of S$10,000. Some national service pre-enlistees will be denied entry into the country if they are in overseas while some pre-enlistees are court-martialled for their failure to enlist or refusal to be conscripted. Most of them were Jehovah's Witnesses, who are usually sentenced to three years' imprisonment in the Singapore Armed Forces Detention Barracks, where they are also separated from other conscription offenders. The government does not consider conscientious objection to be a legal reason for refusal of national service.

Defaulting: draft evasion 
Similarly to enlistees failing to enlist, defaulters would be charged and faced with up to three years' imprisonment and/or a fine of up to S$10,000.

In 2006, there was a public outcry over the "lenient" sentence which Singaporean-born British pianist Melvyn Tan received for defaulting on his national service obligations in the 1970s after obtaining British citizenship. Tan had received a composition fine while other defaulters had been given the maximum fines or imprisonment. Clarity over how judges would sentence a defaulter was clearer in successive landmark cases. In 2010, Seow Wei Sin was initially given an 18-month prison sentence, which was lowered to a fine of S$5,000 on appeal after the courts had determined that Seow had little substantial connection to Singapore except being born here, and thus had a low culpability for committing the default. In 2016, Brian Joseph Chow was initially handed a S$4,500 fine, which was set aside for one-and-a-half month prison sentence upon appeal. Chow had a substantial connection to Singapore, having been born and raised here, thus the prison sentence instead of just a fine. Additionally, by delaying national service obligations, it would violate "the principles of equity and universality and undermined the fair share agreement,” under which all males had to serve at the same time. In Chow's case, Justice Chan Seng Onn listed the factors which would determine the sentence given:
 the duration for which the defaulter evaded NS;
 whether the surrender was voluntary;
 one's performance during NS;
 whether the defaulter had pleaded guilty during trial.

In 2017, the High Court set out new sentencing benchmarks for defaulters which had been described as "more onerous" than the guidelines laid down earlier by Justice Chan Seng Onn. In a written judgment, the court said that the length of sentences should be amplified for those who have defaulted for a longer period of time, to "reflect the decline in a person's physical fitness with age" and also to create a "progressive disincentive" for defaulters to delay their return.

There are four tiers of punishment, which vary in severity according to the length of default period:
Those who evade NS for two to six years face a minimum jail sentence of two to four months.
Those who evade NS for seven to 10 years face a minimum jail sentence of five to eight months.
Those who evade NS for 11 to 16 years face a minimum jail sentence of 14 to 22 months.
Those who evade NS for 17 or more years face a minimum jail sentence of two to three years.

In 2018, Minister of Defence Ng Eng Hen revealed in a parliamentary speech that there was an average of 350 defaulters yearly.

Notable defaulters 
 Benjamin James Davis, a footballer who chose to continue with a second professions contract with Fulham Football Club in 2018, and default on his enlistment in 2019 after failing in his applications for deferment.
 Kevin Kwan, author of the novel Crazy Rich Asians which was adapted into the 2018 film of the same title. Kwan allegedly had entered Singapore multiple times without being arrested, to which the Ministry of Home Affairs refuted.
 Lim Ching Hwang, a Malaysian swimmer who became a permanent resident of Singapore. Lim left Singapore in July 2015 and failed to report for national service in November that year. He returned in June 2018 and enlisted in April 2019.
 Melvyn Tan, Singapore-born British musician who defaulted for more than 3 decades. Tan renounced his Singapore citizenship in 1978, but returned to the country to face charges in 2005. He was fined $3,000, with no jail term.

Types of service

Military service
There are several types of Basic Military Training (BMT) conducted by the Singapore Armed Forces at the Basic Military Training Centre (BMTC) at Pulau Tekong, or at the camps of units which directly draft mono-intake recruits. Combat-fit national servicemen with higher education undergo a nine-week enhanced BMT programme, while those with other educational qualifications and mono-intake recruits undergo the standard BMT programme. Recruits who perform well in BMT will be sent to the Specialist Cadet School (SCS) or Officer Cadet School (OCS) for further training to be specialists (with the rank of Third Sergeant) or commissioned officers (with the rank of Second Lieutenant) respectively. A handful of high-performing candidates are also selected for a nine-month advanced training programme at the Home Team Academy to become Inspectors in the Singapore Police Force or Lieutenants in the Singapore Civil Defence Force. Some national servicemen who have at least NITEC certificates and perform exceptionally well can take the Situational Test to assess their suitability for command positions.

A two-month reduction in full-time national service is offered to all pre-enlistees who are able to pass their three-station Individual Physical Proficiency Test (IPPT) consisting of push-ups, sit-ups and a  run, with a minimum of 61 points. Before April 2015, the IPPT consisted of six stations: the  run, sit-ups, pull-ups, standing-broad jump, sit-and-reach stretch and shuttle-run.

National servicemen whose Physical Employment Status (PES) is C or E, meaning they are non-combat-fit, undergo a nine-week modified BMT which trains them for combat service support vocations. National servicemen who PES is A or B1 and do not pass the Individual Physical Proficiency Test (IPPT) before enlistment will have to undergo an additional four-week Physical Training Phase (PTP), making their entire BMT duration 17 weeks instead of nine weeks. Conscripts who are considered medically obese undergo a 19-week BMT programme aimed at helping them lose weight. The obesity of a conscript is determined by his body mass index (BMI) during the pre-enlistment medical examination. A BMI of above 27 is considered indicative of obesity, as opposed to the World Health Organization's guideline of 30 and above.

Police service
National servicemen serving in the Singapore Police Force (SPF) undergo training at the Home Team Academy, where they study the Penal Code and standard police protocol. After training at the Academy, they will be posted to various departments such as Special Operations Command (SOC), Logistics, Land Divisions and Airport Police Division (APD). Those posted to the Police Coast Guard (PCG) or Protective Security Command (ProCom) will undergo further training. Selection of officer cadets to undergo the NS Probationary Inspector Course (NSPI) is a stringent process for full-time police national servicemen. A very small number, usually those who receive the Best Trainee Award, from each cohort will be selected. The majority of the officer cadets are chosen from candidates who have completed the Singapore Armed Forces' Basic Military Training programme.

The national service ranks in the Singapore Police Force differ slightly from those of the Singapore Armed Forces and Singapore Civil Defence Force. Official correspondence in the Singapore Police Force clearly differentiates a national serviceman from a regular serviceman.

Civil defence service
National servicemen serving in the Singapore Civil Defence Force (SCDF) undergo four weeks of training at the National Service Training Centre (NSTC), where they are given Basic Rescue Training (BRT), exposed to regimental discipline, and trained to maintain the same level of fitness as their counterparts in the armed forces and police force. National servicemen who complete the four-week training at the NSTC are posted out to be trained as medical orderlies (medics), dog handlers, provosts, information and communications and logistics specialists, or physical training instructors, among other vocations.

Within the first two weeks of the BRT stage, high-performing national servicemen may be posted to the Civil Defence Academy to undergo the three-month Firefighter Course (FFC) or the five-month Section Commanders Course (SCC), where they are respectively trained to be Firefighters (with the rank of Lance Corporal) or Fire & Rescue Specialists (with the rank of Sergeant). Admission into the Section Commanders Course typically requires a minimum educational qualification of GCE A Level, Polytechnic Diploma, or Higher NITEC. SCC trainees receive additional rescue and emergency training and undergo a Basic Home Team Course at the Home Team Academy as part of the General Command & Control Term to train them for command positions. Firefighters are typically posted out to the various fire stations around Singapore, while Fire & Rescue Specialists become section commanders at territorial divisions, fire stations or at the Special Rescue Battalion. Depending on their rankings at the time of completing the courses, a small number of them may become instructors in the Civil Defence Academy to staff the Command and Staff Training Centre (CSTC), Specialist Training Centre (STC) or Firefighting Training Centre (FFTC).

The top performing 5–10% of each Section Commanders Course cohort will be selected to undergo the Rota Commanders Course (RTC) to be trained as senior officers (with the rank of Lieutenant).

Criticisms

Alleged racial discrimination
The Malays were virtually excluded from conscription from the beginning of the draft in 1967 until 1977. In 1987, Second Minister for Defence Lee Hsien Loong stated that "if there is a conflict, if the Singapore Armed Forces is called to defend the homeland, we do not want to put any of our soldiers in a difficult position where their emotions for the nation may be in conflict with their religion". After Malays were conscripted into national service, they were assigned mainly to serve in either the Police Force or the Civil Defence Force, but not in the Army, Navy or Air Force. Military analyst Sean Walsh, who wrote The Roar of the Lion City (2007), claimed that "official discrimination against the Malay population remains an open secret".

The Ministry of Defence has refuted Walsh's claim, noting that there are "Malay pilots, commandos and air defence personnel" and stating that "the proportion of eligible Malays selected for specialist and officer training is similar to the proportion of eligible non-Malays."

Alleged preferential treatment
Janil Puthucheary, an elected Member of Parliament from the governing People's Action Party (PAP), was exempted from national service as he is a first-generation naturalised Singapore citizen. Puthucheary, who made his debut as a PAP candidate in the 2011 general election, was unfavourably compared to Chen Show Mao, a candidate from the opposition Workers' Party who had volunteered for national service before becoming a naturalised Singapore citizen. When Puthucheary pointed out that he had spent his career saving children's lives as a paediatrician, he was criticised for equating his profession with national service when a paediatrician is paid more than an average national serviceman. His candidacy led Workers' Party chief Low Thia Khiang to call for an amendment to the Singapore constitution to allow only male candidates who have served their national service to run for elections. In March 2015, Puthucheary joined the first intake of the SAF Volunteer Corps.

During the lead-up to the 2011 presidential election, it was alleged that Patrick Tan, a son of presidential candidate Tony Tan, had received preferential treatment because of his father's status as a PAP member of parliament and cabinet minister. Patrick Tan had been granted a 12-year disruption from full-time national service and had been deployed as a medical scientist in the Defence Medical Research Institute when he resumed national service. The Ministry of Defence refuted the allegation of preferential treatment and explained that Patrick Tan had been granted exemption along with 86 candidates between 1973 and 1992 under a scheme to train medical professionals.

See also
Singapore Armed Forces (SAF)
Singapore Police Force (SPF)
Singapore Civil Defence Force (SCDF)
Awards for Singapore National Serviceman
1954 National Service riotsChinese opposition to conscription service during British rule

External links
iPrepNS – information on Preparation for National Service in Singapore (archived 29 September 2014)
 Singapore Statutes Chapter 93: Enlistment Act (1967), archived in the Attorney General Chamber (AGC) of Singapore.
The NSmen Website
The NSmen's portal
Enlistment Act
Basic Military Training Graduation

References

 
Law enforcement in Singapore
Military of Singapore
Singapore